Christine Walevska (born March 8, 1945, Los Angeles) is an American classical cellist.  She is known for her numerous recordings with Philips Records and performing concerts worldwide.  In 1975, she became the first concert musician to perform in Cuba under the regime of Fidel Castro.  The music critic Antonio Hernandez of the Brazilian newspaper O Globo referred to Walevska as the "goddess of the cello," a moniker to which she has often since been referred.

Stolen cello
When Christine was small, her father bought her a rare antique concert-quality children's cello, hoping to spur her interest in the instrument, which it did.  After she graduated to a full size cello, the instrument was stolen, and its whereabouts remained unknown for 40 years.  When finally found, the current owner (who did not know it had been stolen) had rented it out to another very young but supremely talented cellist, whose family had spent years looking for a concert quality instrument suitable for a young cellist. After meeting the young girl, who loved the instrument as she did, Christine decided not to pursue retrieving her stolen property until after the student had graduated to a larger cello.

References

External links
 Official website

Living people
1945 births
Musicians from Los Angeles
American classical cellists
Classical musicians from California
American women classical cellists
21st-century American women